Andrés Galván Rivas (born 29 August 1960) is a Mexican politician affiliated with the PAN. As of 2013 he served as Senator of the LX and LXI Legislatures of the Mexican Congress representing Durango. He also served as Deputy between 1994 and 1997.

References

1960 births
Living people
Politicians from Durango
Members of the Senate of the Republic (Mexico)
Members of the Chamber of Deputies (Mexico)
National Action Party (Mexico) politicians
21st-century Mexican politicians
20th-century Mexican politicians